Wyoming County is a county in the U.S. state of New York in the state's western area. As of the 2020 census, the population was 40,531. The county seat is Warsaw. The name is modified from a Lenape (Delaware) Native American word meaning "broad bottom lands". Wyoming County was formed from Genesee County in 1841. Wyoming County is one of New York's mostly agricultural counties. With an estimated 47,500 dairy cows in the county, there are more cattle in Wyoming County than people.

History

As with the rest of Western New York, Wyoming County was part of disputed territory throughout the 17th and 18th centuries, claimed by the Massachusetts Bay Colony, Connecticut Colony, Pennsylvania Colony, New York Colony, and New France. New York's claims were not recognized until the Treaty of Hartford was ratified in 1786 and were not actively asserted until the Holland Purchase.

In regard to New York's claim, as of 1683 the present Wyoming County was part of Albany County of the Province of New York. This was an enormous county, including the northern part of New York State as well as all of the present State of Vermont and, in theory, extending westward to the Pacific Ocean. This county was reduced in size on July 3, 1766, by the creation of Cumberland County, and further on March 16, 1770, by the creation of Gloucester County, both containing territory now in the state of Vermont.

On March 12, 1772, what was left of Albany County was split into three parts, one remaining under the name Albany County. One of the other pieces, Tryon County, contained the western portion (and thus, since no western boundary was specified, theoretically still extended west to the Pacific). The eastern boundary of Tryon County was approximately five miles west of the present city of Schenectady, and the county included the western part of the Adirondack Mountains and the area west of the West Branch of the Delaware River. The area then designated as Tryon County now includes 37 counties of New York State.

In the years prior to 1776, most of the Loyalists in Tryon County fled to Canada. In 1784, following the peace treaty that ended the American Revolutionary War, the name of Tryon County was changed to Montgomery County in order to honor the general, Richard Montgomery, who had captured several places in Canada and died attempting to capture the city of Quebec, replacing the name of the hated British governor.

In 1789, Ontario County was split off from Montgomery as part of the establishment of the Morris Reserve.

Almost all of the land west of the Genesee River, including all of present-day Wyoming County, was part of the Holland Land Purchase in 1793. It was sold privately to settlers through the Holland Land Company's office in Batavia, starting in 1801.

Genesee County was created by a splitting of Ontario County in 1802 to govern the land acquired in the Holland Purchase. This territory was much larger than the present Genesee County. It was reduced in size in 1806 by creating Allegany County; again in 1808 by creating Cattaraugus, Chautauqua, and Niagara counties. Niagara County at that time also included the present Erie County.

In 1821, portions of Genesee County were combined with portions of Ontario County to create Livingston and Monroe counties.

Genesee County was further reduced in size in 1824 by creating Orleans County.

Finally, in 1841, Wyoming County was created from the southern half of Genesee County, the northwest corner of Allegany County, and a small portion of the northeast corner of Cattaraugus County.

Geography

Wyoming County is in the western part of New York State, east of Buffalo and slightly west of due south of Rochester.  The county is in the Holland Purchase Region.

The county is largely rural, dotted with small towns. Even the county seat, Warsaw is quite small. The land surface is generally broken and hilly, and the soil fertile. Much of the area is wooded, used for timber. Some that are predominantly maple are tapped each spring for the production of maple syrup. Agriculture dominates the county economy. Apple orchards were once a major agricultural endeavor, but only a few are left. The area is also well known for outdoor sports, being an excellent area for fishing, hunting, and snowmobiling.

An active geologic fault runs down the Dale valley through Linden, to the east of Batavia and into Lake Ontario. Movement of the fault is an occasional source of minor earthquakes, which, at most, have toppled a couple chimneys. The Dale Valley has been developed as a source of salt by way of brine wells, for the chemical industry. A pipeline moves the brine to Niagara Falls.

The county is bounded on the southeast by the Genesee River, and drained by tributaries of that stream, as well as Tonawanda, Buffalo, and other creeks. An important tributary of the Genesee River, Oatka Creek, has its source in the Town of Gainesville within the county.

Adjacent counties
 Genesee County - north
 Livingston County - east
 Allegany County - south
 Cattaraugus County - southwest
 Erie County - west

Major highways

  U.S. Route 20A
  New York State Route 19
  New York State Route 19A
  New York State Route 39
  New York State Route 63
  New York State Route 77
  New York State Route 78
  New York State Route 98
  New York State Route 238
  New York State Route 246
  New York State Route 354
  New York State Route 362
  New York State Route 436

Demographics

At the 2000 census, there were 43,424 people, 14,906 households and 10,717 families residing in the county. The population density was 73 per square mile (28/km2).  There were 16,940 housing units at an average density of 29 per square mile (11/km2).  The racial makeup of the county was 91.84% White, 5.52% Black or African American, 0.27% Native American, 0.37% Asian, 0.02% Pacific Islander, 1.32% from other races, and 0.67% from two or more races. 2.94% of the population were Hispanic or Latino of any race. 31.7% were of German, 12.5% English, 10.9% Irish, 10.2% Polish, 9.3% American and 7.7% Italian ancestry according to Census 2000. 97.1% spoke English and 1.8% Spanish as their first language.

There were 14,906 households, of which 34.20% had children under the age of 18 living with them, 58.30% were married couples living together, 9.20% had a female householder with no husband present, and 28.10% were non-families. 23.20% of all households were made up of individuals, and 10.20% had someone living alone who was 65 years of age or older.  The average household size was 2.62 and the average family size was 3.08.

Age distribution was 24.10% under the age of 18, 8.20% from 18 to 24, 32.80% from 25 to 44, 22.80% from 45 to 64, and 12.20% who were 65 years of age or older. The median age was 37 years. For every 100 females there were 118.30 males. For every 100 females age 18 and over, there were 122.40 males.

The median household income was $39,895, and the median family income was $45,088. Males had a median income of $31,973 versus $22,252 for females. The per capita income for the county was $17,248. About 5.80% of families and 8.40% of the population were below the poverty line, including 11.60% of those under age 18 and 5.80% of those age 65 or over.

2020 Census

Government

Wyoming County is somewhat unusual among New York counties in that it remains governed by a 16-member Board of Supervisors, consisting of the town supervisor of each town in its territory.

State and federal government

Wyoming County is part of:
 The 8th Judicial District of the New York Supreme Court
 The 4th Department of the New York Supreme Court, Appellate Division

Politics

|}

Wyoming County, like the state of the same name, is extremely conservative. Like the state of Wyoming, it voted for Donald Trump by a margin of almost 50 points. In state and national politics, Wyoming County is one of the most Republican counties in New York, a state that characteristically votes Democratic. In both the 2004 and 2008 U.S. presidential elections, it was the second-reddest county in New York, behind Hamilton County. In fact, the only Democrat to carry the county since the Civil War has been Lyndon Baines Johnson in 1964, during an election when no county in the Empire State supported Republican Barry Goldwater. In 2004, George W. Bush carried Wyoming County by a 30.9 percent margin over John Kerry, with Kerry carrying the state by an 18.3 percent margin. However, Senator Chuck Schumer concurrently won the county very narrowly; this was the last time that Wyoming County voted Democratic in a statewide federal election. In 2008, John McCain won the county by a 26.1 percent margin over Barack Obama, with Obama defeating McCain statewide by 26.7 percent. In New York's 2006 U.S. Senatorial election, Wyoming County voted for John Spencer by a 4% margin over Hillary Clinton, with Clinton being re-elected by a 36% margin over Spencer. In 2010, Wyoming County was one of only three counties to favor Republican Jay Townsend over Schumer. In the Senate Special election that same year, the county favored Republican Joe DioGuardi over the Democratic incumbent, Kirsten Gillibrand. In 2012, Wyoming County again selected a Republican for this seat, being one of only two counties (the other being neighboring Allegany County) to vote in favor of Republican candidate Wendy Long rather than Gillibrand. In 2016, Wyoming County once again favored Long as she lost statewide to Schumer. In 2018, the county once again rejected Gillibrand by favoring Republican Chele Farley.

Points of interest
 Letchworth State Park, on the Genesee River forms part of the southeastern boundary of the county. A deep gorge with three major waterfalls characterize this scenic and historic area, created when a glacier during the last Ice age diverted the river and forced it to cut a new valley. It is the home area of Mary Jemison, the White Woman of the Genesee, who was captured as a young person by the Seneca tribe and became an important figure in negotiations between the tribe and the land companies.
 Middlebury Academy, in Wyoming village, the first high school level school west of the Genesee. The Greek revival building still exists and is on the National Register of Historic Places.
 Hillside Inn, opened originally as a spa at mineral springs on the hill above Wyoming village around 1841, has entertained many important persons, including Theodore Roosevelt and his family and Susan B. Anthony,
 Arcade and Attica Railroad is a restoration of a steam locomotive.
 Attica maximum security prison is located in the northernmost part of the county.
 The Bliss Wind Farm is located in Eagle.
 Gaslight Village - downtown Wyoming is a historic village lit by gas street lamps. Deposits of natural gas and salt have been an economic factor in the development of the area.
 Silver Lake - this tiny glacial lake is the only one of the Finger Lakes group of lakes that is west of the Genesee.
 Morton Salt - One of the largest salt mines in the Northeast is located in Silver Springs and has been running since the mid-to-late 19th century.
 Charcoal Corral - Twin drive-in theater with pizza, ice cream, golf, concerts, arcade, cruise night, and restaurant.

Communities

Larger Settlements

Towns

 Arcade
 Attica
 Bennington
 Castile
 Covington
 Eagle
 Gainesville
 Genesee Falls
 Java
 Middlebury
 Orangeville
 Perry
 Pike
 Sheldon
 Warsaw
 Wethersfield

Hamlets
 North Java
 Portageville
 Silver Lake

Notable people
 James H. Agen, (1847–1921), Wisconsin State Assemblyman
 Joseph M. Bailey, (1833–1895) born in Middlebury, Chief Justice of the Illinois Supreme Court
 Daniel F. Bakeman, last surviving veteran of the American Revolutionary War
 Susan (née Brewer) Bakeman and Daniel F. Bakeman share the longest claimed marriage on record and also the only marriage claimed to have exceeded 90 years.
 Calvin Fairbank, (1816–1898), born in Allegany County (now Wyoming County), Methodist clergyman and staunch abolitionist.
 Ed Don George, (1905–1985), born in North Java, New York, professional wrestler, naval commander.
 John Victor Skiff, (1908–1964), born in Gainesville;  environmental conservationist and public servant.
 David Starr Jordan, (1851–1931), born in Gainesville; an ichthyologist, educator and peace activist.
 Barber Conable, born in Warsaw. US Representative, former head of the World Bank.
 Chester A. Arthur, lived for a time in Perry. U. S. President.
 Thomas Aquinas Daly, b. 1937. Resident of Arcade. Artist.
 Ray Witter (1896–1983), American football player

See also

 List of counties in New York
 National Register of Historic Places listings in Wyoming County, New York

References

Further reading

External links
  Wyoming County
  Wyoming County Tourism Promotion Agency
  Wyoming County Chamber of Commerce
 
 Cornell Cooperative Extension of Wyoming County

 
1841 establishments in New York (state)
Populated places established in 1841
New York placenames of Native American origin